Greece participated at the 2013 World Championships in Athletics in Moscow, Russia, from 10 to 18 August 2013.
A team of 17 athletes (8 men, 9 women) represented the country in the event.

Results
(q – qualified, NM – no mark, SB – season best)

Men
Track and road events

Field events

Women 
Track and road events

Field events

Heptathlon

See also
Greece at the IAAF World Championships in Athletics

References

External links
IAAF World Championships 2013 – Greece

Nations at the 2013 World Championships in Athletics
World Championships in Athletics
Greece at the World Championships in Athletics